Restrepia roseola, the rosy restrepia, is a species of orchid endemic to Venezuela.

References

External links 

roseola
Endemic orchids of Venezuela